San Bartolomé de Pinares is a municipality located in the province of Ávila, Castile and León, Spain, with a population of 627 inhabitants (2011 census, INE). Only 20 km from Ávila, it has long been important for its livestock.

Named for St. Bartholomew, the village is often associated with the local Herrerian style church Iglesia de San Bartolomé Apóstol.

The teacher and journalist Juan Grande Martín (January 12, 1914 – November 13, 1981) was born here.

Festival 

Each year on January 16, the eve of the festival of Saint Anthony, the town celebrates the traditional Luminarias festival. Purportedly held for five centuries, the origins of the festival trace back to a ritual purification to preserve the health of the horses in the village. Bonfires are lit in the central streets, and horses jump through the flames, with the smoke intended to protect the animals from disease.

References

External links 
 Tourism site
 Festival of bonfires and horses : Pictures

Municipalities in the Province of Ávila